The Ugab River is an ephemeral river in north-western Namibia. Its lower section forms the border between Kunene Region and Erongo Region but its catchment area extends well into the Otjozondjupa Region. Ugab's source is near Otavi. From there the riverbed leads westwards past the Paresis Mountains and the Fransfontein Mountains into the Skeleton Coast and the Atlantic Ocean. Inflows of the Ugab are Erundu, Ozongombo, Okomize and Uis.

The river only flows above the surface of its sandy bed a few days each year, but even during much of the dry season its subterranean water surfaces as pools in places, and provides an important resource for species in the Damaraland region of northern Namibia.

The Ugab River's large subterranean water content makes it a major Namibian river. The Ugab Wilderness Area was established here to protect the future of these rare animals. Important tourism destinations are the Brandberg, the Doros Crater and Vingerklip, settlements in its catchment area are the towns of Outjo and Otjiwarongo, as well as the settlements of Kalkfeld, Omatjette and Uis.

It is possible to drive or trek the length of the sandy river, passing local Herero farmers and the pink granite inselbergs (isolated rocky hills left behind after volcanic activity) dotted throughout the region. These bizarre stones have been shaped over the years into vaguely recognisable shapes, some look like toadstools, while others are eerie hollow structures known as the 'Petrified Ghosts'.

Quite a few plants grow there; much of the visible vegetation is the wild tobacco (Nicotiana glauca). Also found there are some stunted acacia trees and ǃnara bushes (Acanthosicyos horridus), with their almost-leafless spiky green stems, and improbably large melons.

References

Rivers of Namibia
Geography of Erongo Region
Geography of Kunene Region
Geography of Otjozondjupa Region